"Bakhshayish" (or Bakhshaish) - Northwest Persian carpets belonging to the Tabriz type. They got their name from the village (now - the city) Bakhshayish, located 70 kilometres northeast of Tabriz. Until the recent past, this village was the centre of the household items of carpet manufacture production, including chuval, blankets, chuval, dzhurab, as well as lint-free kilim and palas carpets.

Artistic analysis 
The middle field of Bakhshayish carpets usually has a smooth background. In the past, the background was woven from camel hair. However, starting from the second half of the 19th century, the background takes on a different colour - blue or burgundy. The total field of the carpet and the gol (göl) located in the centre of the middle field are strictly proportional. The arts critic Latif Kerimov notes that this gives the composition balance and compactness. The middle field corners and the middle border, forming the centre of the border strip, are adorn by narrow diagonal stripes. On the Absheron Peninsula, these stripes are called "Sharlama" or "Shalnuma".

In artistic terms, the "Bakhshayish" carpet is similar to the "Khilya" and "Surakhani" carpets, which are part of the Baku group. Latif Karimov supposed that the general composition of the Bakhshayish carpet was borrowed from the woollen fabrics of India.

Technical particularities 
The Bakhshayish carpets differ in format and sizes. The most popular carpets are "besh cherek-eddi cherek" (125x200 cm). The density of the knots is the same as that of the Karabakh
carpets. Sometimes the carpets of fine weaving are produced by special order.

See also 
 Tabriz rug

References

Persian rugs and carpets